Osteoclast stimulatory transmembrane protein is a protein that in humans is encoded by the OCSTAMP gene.

References

Further reading